Papyrus 22, designated by  (in the Gregory-Aland numbering of New Testament manuscripts), is an early copy of the New Testament in Greek. It is a papyrus manuscript of the Gospel of John, only containing extant John 15:25-16:2, 21–32. Using the study of comparative writings styles, (palaeography), the manuscript has been dated to the early 3rd century CE. It is the only identified New Testament papyrus to have been written originally as a roll; not a codex or re-using the back of a scroll.

Description 

The text was written in two consecutive columns on a roll. The reverse side is blank. The manuscript employs conventional Nomina Sacra:      . The text contains no punctuation marks.

The Greek text of this codex is considered a representative of the Alexandrian text-type. Aland described it as a normal text and placed it in Category I. This manuscript displays an independent text. Coincidences with the Codex Sinaiticus are frequent, but divergences are noticeable. There are no singular readings. According to Schofield the fragment rather represents the eclecticism of the early papyri before the crystallizing of the textual families had taken place.

It is currently housed at the Glasgow University Library (MS Gen 1026) in Glasgow.

See also 

 List of New Testament papyri

References

Further reading 

 B. P. Grenfell & A. S. Hunt, Oxyrynchus Papyri X, (London 1914), pp. 14–16.

External links 

 Fifty Treasures from Glasgow University Library
 Images of the codex at the CSNTM

New Testament papyri
3rd-century biblical manuscripts
University of Glasgow Library collection
Early Greek manuscripts of the New Testament
Gospel of John papyri